Hans Strand (born 29 November 1955) is a Swedish sports shooter. He competed in the men's 50 metre rifle, prone event at the 1984 Summer Olympics.

References

External links
 

1955 births
Living people
Swedish male sport shooters
Olympic shooters of Sweden
Shooters at the 1984 Summer Olympics
People from Söderhamn
Sportspeople from Gävleborg County